Dermot Joseph Sheriff (10 August 1920 – 10 May 1993) was an Irish basketball player. He competed in the men's tournament at the 1948 Summer Olympics.

References

1920 births
1993 deaths
Irish men's basketball players
Olympic basketball players of Ireland
Basketball players at the 1948 Summer Olympics
Sportspeople from Dublin (city)